Kjell Hovda (born 27 October 1945 in Veggli) is a former Norwegian biathlete.
He participated on the Norwegian team that received silver medals in 4 × 7.5 km relay in the 1973 Biathlon World Championships 1973 in Lake Placid. He won a bronze medal in the relay in the 1974 World Championships in Minsk, and participated in the 1976 Winter Olympics.

Hovda coached the Norwegian national team 1976–80, has also been an expert commentator for NRK.

References

External links

1945 births
Living people
Norwegian male biathletes
Biathlon World Championships medalists
Norwegian sports coaches
Olympic biathletes of Norway
Biathletes at the 1976 Winter Olympics
Norwegian skiing and biathlon commentators
Color commentators